King of the Turf is a 1939 American drama film starring Adolphe Menjou.

Plot
Jim Mason was once a distinguished figure in the sport of horse racing, but his reputation was ruined by a crooked race that caused the death of a horse and a jockey. He becomes an alcoholic and a drifter, forgotten by all.

On a freight train, hopping a free ride, Mason runs into a young runaway boy called Goldie, who has experience as a stable boy. As they become friends, Goldie helps him to give up drinking. They attend a horse auction where, due to a technicality, they are able to buy a horse for just two dollars.

Goldie rides the horse successfully in races, with Mason training him. But when the boy's mother, Eve Barnes, turns up looking for him, Mason realizes to his astonishment that Eve is his ex-wife, making Goldie his own son.

At her behest, Mason spares him from a risky future in horse racing by pretending to revert to his previous corrupt and drunken ways. Goldie refuses, however, to deliberately lose the big race as the crooked gamblers demand.

Cast
 Adolphe Menjou as Mason
 Roger Daniel as Goldie
 Dolores Costello as Eve
 William Demarest as Arnold

References

External links
King of the Turf at IMDb

lobby card

1939 films
American black-and-white films
1939 drama films
Films directed by Alfred E. Green
American drama films
Films produced by Edward Small
1930s English-language films
1930s American films